BMG Australia is the Australian office of the international music company BMG Rights Management.

The Australian office opened in March 2016, with music executive Heath Johns heading the company as Managing Director. Johns previously worked at Universal Music Publishing Group where he signed and developed Australian talent such as Wolfmother, Jet, The Veronicas, M-Phazes, Guy Sebastian and Peking Duk.

In July 2016, the iconic Australian independent music company Albert Music was acquired by BMG, diverting much of Alberts' contemporary and catalogue writers to BMG Australia's growing local roster.

BMG Australia Roster
The Cat Empire
The Delta Riggs
Drapht
Emmi (Australian singer)
Felix Riebl
Harry James Angus
Jean-Paul Fung
Josh Pyke
L D R U
The Living End
Megan Washington
Montaigne (musician)
Nicole Millar
Old Man River (musician)
Ollie McGill
Peking Duk
Roscoe James Irwin
Russell Morris
SAFIA
San Cisco
Urthboy
Wave Racer
Wolfmother

List of record labels

References

Australian record labels
Australian subsidiaries of foreign companies
Music publishing companies